= Miami football =

Miami football may refer to:

- Miami Hurricanes football, college football team in Miami, Florida
- Miami Redhawks football, college football team in Oxford, Ohio
- Miami Dolphins, National Football League team in Miami, Florida
- Inter Miami CF, professional soccer club in Miami, Florida
